Graham Welbourn (born January 11, 1961) is a Canadian swimmer. He competed in the freestyle events during the 1970s and early 1980s. He was supposed to represent his native country at the 1980 Summer Olympics, but didn't start due to the international boycott of the Moscow Games. A resident of Claresholm, Alberta he won a total number of two medals at the 1979 Pan American Games.

See also
 List of Commonwealth Games medallists in swimming (men)

References
Canadian Olympic Committee

1961 births
Living people
Canadian male freestyle swimmers
Sportspeople from British Columbia
Place of birth missing (living people)
Swimmers at the 1979 Pan American Games
Swimmers at the 1982 Commonwealth Games
Commonwealth Games medallists in swimming
Pan American Games silver medalists for Canada
Pan American Games bronze medalists for Canada
Commonwealth Games bronze medallists for Canada
Pan American Games medalists in swimming
Medalists at the 1979 Pan American Games
Medallists at the 1982 Commonwealth Games